The following outline is provided as an overview of and topical guide to control engineering:

Control engineering – engineering discipline that applies control theory to design systems with desired behaviors. The practice uses sensors to measure the output performance of the device being controlled and those measurements can be used to give feedback to the input actuators that can make corrections toward desired performance. When a device is designed to perform without the need of human inputs for correction it is called automatic control (such as cruise control for regulating a car's speed).

Branches

 Adaptive control
 Control theory – interdisciplinary branch of engineering and mathematics that deals with the behavior of dynamical systems. The usual objective of control theory is to calculate solutions for the proper corrective action from the controller that result in system stability.
 Digital control
 Energy-shaping control
 Fuzzy control
 Hybrid control
 Intelligent control
 Model predictive control
 Multivariable control
 Neural control
 Nonlinear control
 Optimal control
 Real-time control
 Robust control
 Stochastic control

Mathematical concepts
 Complex analysis
 Differential equations
 Linear algebra
 Mathematical system theory
 Matrices
 Real analysis
 Variational calculus

System properties
 Bode plot
 Block diagram
 Closed-loop transfer function
 Controllability
 Fourier transform
 Frequency response
 Laplace transform
 Negative feedback
 Observability
 Performance
 Positive feedback
 Root locus method
 Servomechanism
 Signal-flow graph
 State space representation
 Stability theory
 Steady state analysis & design
 System dynamics
 Transfer function

Digital control
 Discrete-time signal
 Digital signal processing
 Quantization
 Real-time software
 sampled data
 System identification
 Z transform

Advanced techniques
 Artificial neural networks
 Coefficient diagram method
 Control reconfiguration
 Distributed parameter systems
 Fractional-order control
 Fuzzy logic
 H-infinity loop-shaping
 Hankel singular value
 Kalman filter
 Krener's theorem
 Least squares
 Lyapunov stability
 Minor loop feedback
 Perceptual control theory
 State observer
 Vector control

Tools
 Labview
 Matlab
 Simulink

Controllers
 Embedded controller
 Closed-loop controller
 Lead-lag compensator
 Numerical control
 PID controller
 Programmable logic controller

Control applications
 Automation and remote control
 Distributed control system
 Electric motors
 Industrial control systems
 Mechatronics
 Motion control
 Process Control
 Robotics
 Supervisory control (SCADA)

Control engineering organizations 

 Control System Integrators Association
 International Federation of Automatic Control

Publications about control engineering

Persons influential in control engineering
 People in systems and control

See also 
 Outline of automation
 Outline of engineering
 Outline of manufacturing
 Outline of production
 Outline of robotics

References

External links 

Control Labs Worldwide
The Michigan Chemical Engineering Process Dynamics and Controls Open Textbook

Control engineering
Control engineering
Control engineering
Control engineering